Mark Johnston may refer to:

Mark Johnston (racehorse trainer) (born 1959), Scottish racehorse trainer
Mark Johnston (historian) (born 1960), Australian historian, teacher and author
Mark Johnston (American football) (born 1938), American  football cornerback 
Mark Johnston (swimmer) (born 1979), freestyle swimmer from Canada
Mark Johnston (philosopher), Australian philosopher
Mark T. Johnston (born 1970), jockey in thoroughbred horse racing
J. Mark Johnston, member of the South Dakota Senate

See also
Mark Johnson (disambiguation)